In poker, the Independent Chip Model (ICM) is a mathematical model used to approximately calculate a player's overall equity in a tournament. The model uses stack sizes alone to determine how often a player will finish in each position (1st, 2nd, etc.). A player's probability of finishing in each position is then multiplied by the prize amount for that position and those numbers are added together to determine the player's overall equity.

The ICM is also known as the Malmuth–Harville method. In 1973 David Harville published a method to calculate the probability for a horse to finish 1st, 2nd, etc. in a horse race. In 1987 Mason Malmuth, independent of Harville, used this method to calculate the probability for a tournament player to finish 1st, 2nd, etc.

The term ICM is often misunderstood to mean a simulator that helps a player make decisions in a tournament. Such simulators often make use of the Independent Chip Model but are not strictly speaking ICM calculators. A true ICM calculator will have the chip counts of all players, as well as the payout structure of the tournament, as input and each player's equity as output.

The ICM can be applied to answer specific questions, such as:

 The range of hands that a player can move all in with, considering the action so far and the stack sizes of the other players still in the hand
 The range of hands that a player can call another player's all in with, and recommends either calling or moving all in over the top, considering all the stacks still in the hand
 When discussing a deal, how much money each player should get

The calculation using the ICM can be elaborated as below:
 Every player's chance of finishing 1st is proportional to its chip count
 If player i did not finish 1st, given player k finished 1st, player i chance of finishing 2nd is P(Xi,2|Xk,1) = xi/(1-xk）
 Following this logic, given m1 finish 1st, m2 finished 2nd, mj-1 finish j-1th, the chance of player i finish jth place is P(Xi,j|Xm1,1, Xm2,x.....Xmj-1,j-1) = xi/(1-xm1-xm2-....-xmj-1)
 Sum of the value in each permutation (using enumeration, computation complexity = O(n!))
For example:

3 players A,B,C have 50%, 30%, 20% chips, the payout is 1st place 70, 2nd place 30

P(A=1,B=2,C=3) = 0.5*(0.3/(1-0.5))=0.3

P(A=1,C=2,B=3) = 0.5*(0.2/(1-0.5))=0.2

P(B=1,A=2,C=3) = 0.3*(0.5/(1-0.3))=0.2143

P(B=1,A=3,C=2) = 0.3*(0.2/(1-0.3))=0.0857

P(C=1,A=2,B=3) = 0.2*(0.5/(1-0.2))=0.125

P(C=1,A=3,B=2) = 0.2*(0.3/(1-0.2))=0.075

ICM(A) = 70*(0.3+0.2)+30*(0.2143+0.125)=45.18, unit chip value = 45.18/50 = 0.9036

ICM(B) = 70*(0.2143+0.0857)+30*(0.3+0.075)=32.25, unit chip value = 32.25/30 = 1.075

ICM(C) = 70*(0.125+0.075)+30*(0.2+0.0857)=22.57, unit chip value = 22.57/20 = 1.1285

ICM precision

2-players case

For any one of the 2 players the probability to finish 1st is exactly equal to its share of the tournament chips. The ICM gives perfect results.

3-players case

The Finite element method (FEM) can be used to compute for any player its exact probabilities to finish 1st, 2nd etc. and its exact tournament equity. Those exact values allows for an evaluation of the precision of the ICM.

The FEM is used to compute the exact values for all the repartitions of 200 big blinds between 3 players. The table hereafter summarizes the comparison of the approximate ICM values versus the exact FEM values.

The big blind repartition 25-87-88 gives the largest difference between an ICM and a FEM probability (0.0360) and the largest tournament equity difference ($0.36 for tournament payouts $50/$30/$20). The relative difference between an ICM and a FEM tournament equity [(ICM- FEM)/FEM)] is 1.42%

The big blind repartition 25-87-88 gives the largest relative difference between an ICM and a FEM tournament equity (1.43%).

The big blind repartition 198-1-1 gives the largest relative difference between an ICM and a FEM probability (4900%). However that large relative difference has no impact on the tournament equity.

Although the ICM does a poor job when computing the exact probability of a player to finish 1st, 2nd , etc., it gives fairly good tournament equities for the 3-players case.

4-players case

The FEM is used to compute the exact values for all the repartitions of 100 big blinds between 4 players. The table hereafter summarizes the comparison of the approximate ICM values versus the exact FEM values.

The ICM gives fairly good tournament equities for the 4-players case.

Finite element method 
The finite element method (FEM) is used to compute the exact tournament equity for the 3-players case.

Player A, B and C  have respectively i, j and k chips with i + j + k = total chip count N.

p1st(i, j, k) is the probability for player A to be 1st (that is to win the tournament) when players A, B and C  have respectively i, j and k chips.

p2nd(i, j, k) is the probability for player A to be 2nd.

p3rd(i, j, k) is the probability for player A to be 3rd.

Of course:

p1st(i, j, k) = p1st(i, k, j)

p2nd(i, j, k) = p2nd(i, k, j)

p3rd(i, j, k) = p3rd(i, k, j)

p1st(i, j, k) + p2nd(i, j, k) + p3rd(i, j, k) = 1

The player chip counts (i, j, k) can be put in a 3 dimensional space. Due to the constraint i + j + k = N the player chip counts are on a 3D plane. The constraints i >= 0, j >= 0 and k >= 0 further restrict the place of the player chip counts to the equilateral triangle with vertices at (0, 0, N), (0, N, 0) and (0, 0, N). An equilateral triangle is indeed a convenient representation of the 3-players case that displays symmetries.

The figure corresponds to the case with a total chip count N = 4. It is an occurrence of the 2-simplex. It is also a FEM mesh. Each label corresponds with the chip counts of player A, B and C. Player B side is AC and player B vertex is B. On his side player B has 0 chips. Segments parallel to his side correspond to more chips for player B when they approach its vertex. Player C side is AB and player C vertex is C. Player A side is CB and player A vertex is A.

The equations for p2nd(i, j, k) are:

p2nd(0,1,3) = p2nd(0,2,2) = p2nd(0,3,1) = 0 (player A may not end up 3rd)

p2nd(3,1,0) = p2nd(3,0,1) = ¼ (using 2 players results)

p2nd(2,2,0) = p2nd(2,0,2) = ½

p2nd(1,3,0) = p2nd(1,0,3) = ¾

p2nd(2,1,1) = [p2nd(3,0,1) + p2nd(3,1,0) + p2nd(2,0,2) + p2nd(2,2,0) + p2nd(1,1,2) + p2nd(1,2,1)]/6

p2nd(1,1,2) = [p2nd(2,0,2) + p2nd(1,0,3) + p2nd(0,1,3) + p2nd(0,2,2) + p2nd(1,2,1) + p2nd(2,1,1)]/6

p2nd(1,2,1) = p2nd(1,1,2)

Those equations solves the drunken sailors random walk within a triangular maze. At each crossword (labels 112, 121 or 221) the sailor will randomly select 1 of the 6 options. When the sailor reaches the border of the maze then either he is out of the game (labels 012, 022, 031) or he enters a lower dimension maze (labels 103, 202, etc.).

There is a map between the random walk problem and an electrical network. Each segment between 2 labels of the figure would have 1 ohm resistance. The potential of the border labels would be known (label 013, 022, 031 at 0 volt, label 301, 310 at ¼ volt, label 202, 220 at ½ volt, label 103, 130 at ¾ volt). The equation for each inner label is merely an application of the Kirchhoff's circuit law. The potential of each inner label maps with the probability of finishing 2nd.

The random walk problem is also known as the discrete Dirichlet problem.

Solving the equations gives:

           p2nd(2,1,1) = 0.357143

           p2nd(1,1,2) = p2nd(1,2,1) = 0.321429

Those FEM results are compared against the ICM results in the table hereafter.

References

Further reading
  Harrington discusses the ICM on pages 108-122.
 
 

Poker gameplay and terminology